Coast vs Country is a British property television series on Channel 4 presented by Kerr Drummond, Sara Damergi, Kirsty Duffy and David Bull. It has aired from 14 November 2016 to 16 June 2019.

References

External links
 
 

2016 British television series debuts
2019 British television series endings
2010s British documentary television series
2010s British reality television series
Channel 4 documentary series
Channel 4 original programming
English-language television shows
Television shows set in the United Kingdom